Alexander Fried (May 21, 1902 - May 9, 1988) was an American art critic for the San Francisco Chronicle and The San Francisco Examiner.

Life
Fried was born in New York City on May 21, 1902. He was introduced to opera at a young age. He attended Columbia University, where he earned a bachelor's degree, followed by a master's degree.

Fried began his career as the editor of Musical Digest in New York City. He was the music and dance editor of the San Francisco Chronicle from 1924 to 1936, and the music and art editor of The San Francisco Examiner from 1936 to 1977. According to Fried, "Criticism is a bridge between the arts and the public. It is a bridge over which an ideal critic leads the public in the arts with all possible enthusiasm, sensibility and knowledge."

Fried married Edith Trumpler, a German immigrant. They had two daughters, Harriet Fried and Medelyn English. Fried suffered from Alzheimer's disease, and he retired in the Jewish Home for the Aged. He died of a heart attack on May 9, 1988 in San Francisco, California, at age 85. His widow died in 2017.

References

1902 births
1988 deaths
Writers from New York City
Writers from San Francisco
Columbia University alumni
American art critics
American music critics
American dance critics
Jewish American writers
People with Alzheimer's disease
20th-century American Jews